Khromov is a Russian masculine surname, its feminine counterpart is Khromova. It may refer to
Margarita Ponomaryova (born 1963, also known as Margarita Khromova), Russian hurdler 
Nikita Khromov (1892–1934), Russian football player

Russian-language surnames